Works of Harold Pinter provides a list of Harold Pinter's stage and television plays; awards and nominations for plays; radio plays; screenplays for films; awards and nominations for screenwriting; dramatic sketches; prose fiction; collected poetry; and awards for poetry.  It augments a section of the main article on this author.

Stage and television plays
The Room (1957)
The Birthday Party (1957)
The Dumb Waiter (1957)
A Slight Ache (1958)
The Hothouse (1958)
The Caretaker (1959)
A Night Out (1959)
Night School (1960)
The Dwarfs (1960)
The Collection (1961)
The Lover (1962)
Tea Party (1964)
The Homecoming (1964)
The Basement (1966)
Landscape (1967)
Silence (1968)
Old Times (1970)
Monologue (1972)
No Man's Land (1974)
Betrayal (1978)
Family Voices (1980)
A Kind of Alaska (1982)
Victoria Station (1982)
One for the Road (1984)
Mountain Language (1988)
The New World Order (1991)
Party Time (1991)
Moonlight (1993)
Ashes to Ashes (1996)
Celebration (1999)
Remembrance of Things Past (2000) — stage adaptation of The Proust Screenplay; a collaboration with Di Trevis

Awards and nominations for plays
Broadway
1962 Tony Award Best Play: The Caretaker (nominee)
1967 Tony Award Best Play: The Homecoming (winner)
1972 Tony Award Best Play: Old Times (nominee)
1977 Drama Desk Award Outstanding New Play (Foreign): No Man's Land (nominee)

Dramatic sketches
The Black and White (1959)
Trouble in the Works (1959)
The Last to Go (1959)
Request Stop (1959)
Special Offer (1959)
That's Your Trouble (1959)
That's All (1959)
Interview (1959)
Applicant (1959)
Dialogue for Three (1959)
Umbrellas (1960)
Night (1969)
Precisely (1983)
"God's District" (1997) — monologue written for the revue Then Again...
Press Conference (2002)
Apart From That (2006)

Radio plays
Voices (2005) — collaboration with composer James Clarke

Screenplays for films
The Caretaker (1963)
The Servant (1963)
The Pumpkin Eater (1963)
"The Compartment" (1965) — unpublished screenplay for unproduced film; adapted for stage as The Basement (1966)
The Quiller Memorandum (1965)
Accident (1966)
The Birthday Party (1968) — unpublished screenplay adapted by Pinter from his play The Birthday Party (1957)
The Go-Between (1970)
The Homecoming (1969)
Langrishe, Go Down (1970; adapted for TV 1978; film release 2002)
The Proust Screenplay (1972) — published 1978, but unproduced for film; adapted by Harold Pinter and director Di Trevis for the stage (2000); cf. Remembrance of Things Past
The Last Tycoon (1974)
The French Lieutenant's Woman (1981)
Betrayal (1982, 1983)
Victory (1982) — published but unproduced

Turtle Diary (1984)
"The Handmaid's Tale" (1987) — unpublished credited screenplay commissioned for the 1990 film The Handmaid's Tale
Reunion (1989)
The Heat of the Day (1988) — adapted for TV
The Comfort of Strangers (1989)
"The Remains of the Day" (1991) — unpublished and uncredited (at Pinter's request) screenplay commissioned for the 1993 film The Remains of the Day
Party Time (1992) — revised and adapted for TV
The Trial (1993)
"Lolita" (1994) — unpublished and uncredited screenplay commissioned for the 1997 film Lolita
The Dreaming Child (1997) — published but unproduced; adapted from a short story by Isak Dinesen
"The Tragedy of King Lear" (2000) — unpublished screenplay commissioned by actor Tim Roth for a film to be directed by Roth, but not produced
Sleuth (2007)

Awards and nominations for screenwriting
1963 BAFTA Best British Screenplay: The Servant (nominee)
1964 BAFTA Best British Screenplay: The Pumpkin Eater (winner)
1966 BAFTA Best British Screenplay: The Quiller Memorandum (nominee)
1967 BAFTA Best British Screenplay: Accident (nominee)
1972 Society of Film and Television Arts Best Screenplay: The Go-Between (winner)
1972 BAFTA Best Screenplay: The Go-Between (winner)
1976 David di Donatello (Italian Academy Awards) Best Foreign Screenplay: The Last Tycoon (winner)
1976 Ennio Flaiano Award for Screenwriting: The Last Tycoon (winner)
1981 BAFTA Best Screenplay: The French Lieutenant's Woman (nominee)
1981 Academy Award for Best Screenplay Based on Material from Another Medium: The French Lieutenant's Woman (nominee)
1982 David di Donatello (Italian Academy Awards) Best Foreign Screenplay: The French Lieutenant's Woman (winner)
1982 Golden Globe Award for Best Screenplay––Motion Picture: The French Lieutenant's Woman (nominee)
1983 Academy Award for Best Screenplay Based on Material From Another Medium: Betrayal (nominee)
1983 BAFTA Best Adapted Screenplay: Betrayal (nominee)

Prose fiction
"Kullus" (1949)
The Dwarfs (written from 1952 to 1956; rev. and first published 1990) (Novel)
"Latest Reports from the Stock Exchange" (1953)
"The Black and White" (1954–55)
"The Examination" (1955)
"Tea Party" (1963)
"The Coast" (1975)
"Problem" (1976)
"Lola" (1977)
"Short Story" (1995)
"Girls" (1995)
"Sorry About This" (1999)
"Tess" (2000)
"Voices in the Tunnel" (2001)
"The Mirror" (2007)

Collected poetry
Poems (1971)
I Know the Place (1977)
Poems and Prose 1949–1977 (1978)
Ten Early Poems (1990)
Collected Poems and Prose (1995)
"The Disappeared" and Other Poems (2002)
Poems by Harold Pinter Chosen by Antonia Fraser.  Warwick: Greville Press Pamphlets, 2002.  (Limited ed. of 300 copies, "of which the first fifty are numbered and signed by the selector.")
Six Poems for A.  Warwick: Greville Press Pamphlets, 2007.    (10).   (13).

Anthologies and other collections
99 Poems in Translation: An Anthology Selected by Harold Pinter, Anthony Astbury, & Geoffrey Godbert (1994)
100 Poems by 100 Poets: An Anthology Selected by Harold Pinter, Anthony Astbury, & Geoffrey Godbert (1987; rpt. 1992)
101 Poems Against War (2003). Eds. Matthew Hollis & Paul Kegan.  Afterword Andrew Motion.  (Incl. "American Football", by Harold Pinter [80].)
War (2003)
Various Voices: Prose, Poetry, Politics 1948–2005 (1998; rev. & updated, 2005)
Death etc. (2005)
The Essential Pinter (2006)
Various Voices: Sixty Years of Prose, Poetry, Politics 1948–2008 (1998 & 2005; rev. & updated, 2009)

Awards for poetry
2004 Wilfred Owen Award for Poetry

Speeches

"Art, Truth and Politics" (2005) ["Nobel Lecture" delivered live via video on 7 Dec. 2005]

See also

Characteristics of Harold Pinter's work

Notes

Works cited

Baker, William, and John C. Ross, comps.  Harold Pinter: A Bibliographical History.  London: The British Library and New Castle, DE: Oak Knoll P, 2005.   (10).   (13).  Print.  "Oak Knoll Press Bestsellers",  .  Oak Knoll Press, 2007.  Web.  2 Oct. 2007.  (Page 37 of 40 pages.)

"Biobibliographical Notes" and "Bibliography" for "Harold Pinter, Nobel Prize in Literature 2005."  In "Bio-bibliography".  By The Swedish Academy. The Nobel Prize in Literature 2005.  nobelprize.org.  The Swedish Academy and The Nobel Foundation, Oct. 2005.  Web.  6 Jan. 2009. (English HTML version.) [Additional PDF versions accessible in English, French, German, and Swedish via hyperlinks.]

Harold Pinter: An Inventory of His Collection at the Harry Ransom Humanities Research Center (1960–1980).  Harry Ransom Humanities Research Center, University of Texas at Austin, 1999.  Web.  5 Apr. 2009.

"Links: Libraries and Academia" and "Publications": "Works By" and "Works About" Pinter.  haroldpinter.org.  Harold Pinter, 2000–[2009].  Web.  18 Apr. 2009.

Merritt, Susan Hollis, comp.  "Harold Pinter Bibliography". SusanHollisMerritt.org.  Susan Hollis Merritt, 2009.  Web.  18 Apr. 2009.  (Webpage pertaining to the "Harold Pinter Bibliography" published in The Pinter Review.  Tampa: U of Tampa P, 1987–  .)

–––.  "Harold Pinter Bibliography: 2000–2002."  The Pinter Review: Collected Essays 2003 and 2004.  Ed. Francis Gillen and Steven H. Gale.  Tampa: U of Tampa P, 2004.  242–300.  Print.

–––.  "Harold Pinter Bibliography: 2002–2004 With a Special Supplement on the 2005 Nobel Prize in Literature, October 2005 – May 2006."  The Pinter Review: Nobel Prize/Europe Theatre Prize Volume: 2005–2008.  Ed. Francis Gillen with Steven H. Gale.  Tampa: U of Tampa P, 2008.  261–343.  Print.

The Pinter Review.  Tampa: U of Tampa P, 1987–   ).  Ed. Francis Gillen and Steven H. Gale.  HaroldPinter.org.  Harold Pinter, 2000–[2008].  Web.  3 Jan. 2009.  [Table of contents of past issues, retyped on index Webpage; occasional typographical variations.]

The Pinter Review: Nobel Prize/Europe Theatre Prize Volume: 2005–2008.  Ed. Francis Gillen with Steven H. Gale.  Tampa: U of Tampa P, 2008.    (hardcover).   (softcover).  .  Print.

External links

"Directing: Stage, film and TV productions directed by Harold Pinter" and "Prose – Fiction" – Sections of HaroldPinter.org: The Official Website of International Playwright Harold Pinter
Harold Pinter – Graphic feature of covers, programs, and posters of selected plays and films (with production information) for the Cort Theatre's 2007–2008 40th-anniversary Broadway revival of The Homecoming (accessible from home page menu)
Harold Pinter (1930–2008) at The Poetry Archive – Includes audio recording by Harold Pinter of "It Is Here", "Later", and "Episode" made on 16 December 2002 at The Audio Workshop, London, as produced by Richard Carrington
Harold Pinter's reading of a selection of his prose fiction and poems, 92nd Street Y New York City, 12 November 1964 – Hyperlinked in "92Y Podcast: Remembering Harold Pinter, British Playwright", 25 December 2008 (MP3; 65:41); includes: "Tea Party / New Year in the Midlands / A Glass at Midnight / You in the Night / The Drama in April / The Anesthetist’s Pen / Jig / Episode / Afternoon / The Error of Alarm / The Table / The Black and White (prose monologue) … / The Examination—followed by a Q&A where he talks about literary influences, point of view, his opinion of Edward Albee's Who's Afraid of Virginia Woolf? and the classic Beatles vs. Rolling Stones debate"
"Harold Pinter": PWF 1999 – Ftom the archive of the Prague Writers' Festival (PWF)

Bibliographies by writer
Theatre of the Absurd
Bibliographies of British writers
Harold Pinter
Dramatist and playwright bibliographies